The Canada national cricket team represents Canada in international cricket. The team is administered by Cricket Canada, which became an Associate Member of the International Cricket Council (ICC) in 1968.

With the United States, Canada was one of the two participants in the first ever international cricket match, played in New York City in 1844. The annual Canada–U.S. fixture is now known as the Auty Cup. Canada's first international match against a team other than the U.S. came in 1932, when Australia toured. As with the ICC associate members, the team's first major international tournament was the 1979 ICC Trophy in England, where they qualified for the 1979 World Cup after placing second to Sri Lanka. After that, Canada did not make another World Cup until 2003, although they remained one of the leading associate teams. From 2006 to 2013, Canada had both One Day International (ODI) and Twenty20 International status, making appearances at the 2007 and 2011 World Cups. However, since the introduction of the new World Cricket League divisional structure, the team has been less successful – they placed amongst the bottom teams at the 2014 World Cup Qualifier and the 2015 WCL Division Two tournaments, and were consequently relegated to the 2017 Division Three event.

In April 2018, the ICC decided to grant full Twenty20 International (T20I) status to all its members. Therefore, all Twenty20 matches played between Canada and other ICC members since 1 January 2019 have been full T20I matches.

History

Early days

It is generally thought that cricket was introduced to Canada by British soldiers after the Battle of the Plains of Abraham in 1759, although the earliest confirmed reference to cricket is of matches played on Saint Helen's Island, Quebec in 1785 on what later became the site of Expo 67.

The roots of modern Canadian cricket though come from the regions of Upper Canada, in particular Toronto, then known as York. During the early years of the nineteenth century, a schoolmaster by the name of George Anthony Barber encouraged the game there, and founded the Toronto Cricket Club in 1827. Barber instigated a game played between the Toronto Cricket Club and the cricket team of Upper Canada College in 1836, a game won by the college team. This game has been played annually ever since. As already mentioned, Canada played its first international against the USA in 1844 in New York at St George's Cricket Club, now the site of the New York University Medical Center.

Late 19th century
George Parr led an English team to Canada in 1859, which was the first ever international cricket tour. A product of the tour was a book by Fred Lillywhite entitled The English Cricketers' Trip to Canada and the United States, published the following year. On the tour, which also ventured into the US, the team won all five official matches against a 22 of Lower Canada (by 8 wickets at Montreal, Quebec on 26 October – 27 September), a 22 of the United States (by an innings and 64 runs at Hoboken, New Jersey on 3–5 October), a different 22 of the United States (by 7 wickets at Philadelphia on 10–12 October), a 22 of Lower Canada (by 10 wickets at Hamilton, Ontario on 17–19 October) and a further 22 of the United States (by an innings and 68 runs at Rochester, New York on 21–25 October). There were also some exhibition matches and two excursions to view the Niagara Falls.

When Canada became a nation in 1867, cricket was so popular it was declared the national sport by John A. Macdonald, the first Prime Minister of Canada. The influence of baseball from the United States saw a decline in the popularity of cricket, despite tours from English and Australian teams. The third tour by an English team in 1872 featured none other than the famous W. G. Grace. The first Australian team to tour came in 1877, and they returned in 1893 beating Canada by an innings. Three games were played against Ireland between 1888 and 1890, Ireland winning one, with the other two drawn. A tour of North America by the Australians in 1913 saw two first-class games (both won by the tourists) against a combined Canada–USA team. The second of these, played at Rosedale, Toronto, was the first first-class match played in Canada.

1887 England tour
The first official tour of the United Kingdom by a Canadian team took place in 1887: an unofficial tour in 1880 had been abandoned after Canadian captain Thomas Dale (playing under the alias Thomas Jordan) was arrested on charges of desertion and fraud during a match against Leicestershire.

The tour started with two matches against Ireland, against whom Canada drew one game and lost the other, followed by two matches against Scotland with the same result. The tour then ventured into the north east of England with a defeat against the Gentlemen of Northumberland and a draw against Durham.

The tour then continued with various matches against county sides and others, with wins coming against the Gentlemen of Derbyshire and the Gentlemen of Warwickshire. The Canadian team finished the tour with a win–loss record of 2/5 with the remaining twelve games all drawn.

1950s
The Marylebone Cricket Club visited Canada in 1951, the highlight of which was the first first-class game played by the Canadian national team, played in Armour Heights, Toronto, which was won by the visiting side. This was followed in 1954 by a tour to England on which Canada played eighteen games, four of which were given first-class status, including one against Pakistan who were also touring England at the same time. The MCC again visited Canada in 1959 under Dennis Silk, and played a 3-day game against a Canada XI in Toronto which they won by 10 wickets. They were undefeated throughout the tour, winning most of their matches by wide margins, but had a closely fought draw against the Toronto Cricket Club. This was the decade when the Imperial Cricket Conference had plans to grant Canada Test status, but Canada themselves postponed the idea as they felt that the Canadian national team was not of sufficient standard, and that competing against full-members' sides needed some time as they wanted to improve their cricket even domestically. However, things did not go as planned and it would be fifty years before Canada next played a first-class match.

1960s
The annual series of matches between Canada and the USA continued, alternating between the countries. In the 1963 match in Toronto, Ray Nascimento scored 176, then a record for the series.

1970s
Canada drew a game against Ireland in 1973, and the following year again embarked on a tour of England. The tour was a much lower profile than the 1954 tour, with the games being against club sides, county second XIs, and minor counties. Canada had a 4/6 win–loss record on the tour, with a further six games being drawn. In 1979, Canada participated in the first ICC Trophy. They reached the final of the competition, which qualified them for the 1979 World Cup, where they played their first One Day Internationals.

The World Cup was not a successful tournament for the Canadians though, and they failed to progress beyond the first round, losing all three games.

1980s
Canada participated in the ICC Trophy again in 1982 and 1986. They could not repeat their success of 1979 though, and failed to progress beyond the first round on both occasions. Other internationals in the 1980s include a no result game against Ireland in 1981, and a 3 wicket loss to Barbados.

1990s
The 1990s saw Canada progress up the international ladder, playing in three further ICC Trophy tournaments, their best being a seventh-place finish in 1997. They also began competing in West Indian domestic one-day cricket in 1996, and competed in the Commonwealth Games cricket tournament in 1998, though they did not progress beyond the first round.

2000s
2000 saw Canada host the first ICC Americas Championship, a tournament which they won. The following year they embarked on a tour to Sri Lanka, but the highlight of 2001 was their hosting of the ICC Trophy. They finished third in the tournament, which qualified them for the 2003 World Cup. It was this ICC Trophy tournament that first saw the emergence of John Davison, who was to become one of Canada's most successful players.

Canada played various matches in the buildup to the World Cup, visiting Argentina in April 2002, finishing as runners up to longtime rivals the US in the Americas Championship, swiftly followed by a fifth-place finish in the ICC 6 Nations Challenge in Namibia. The West Indian A team toured Canada later in the year, and Canada won the one-day series 2–1, and drew a two-day game. This was followed by Canada's best performance to date in West Indian domestic one-day cricket, winning two games in their first round group, just missing out on qualification for the semi finals.

The World Cup itself was a tournament of contrasting fortunes for the Canadians. They started with their first ODI win, over Bangladesh. Two games later saw them dismissed for 36 against Sri Lanka, then the lowest score in One Day International history. The next game against the West Indies saw John Davison score the fastest ever World Cup century, although Canada lost that game, and did not progress past the first round.

2004–2008
2006 started badly for Canada, with a last place finish in the Six Nations Challenge in the United Arab Emirates after Canada lost all their games. They had improved significantly by the time of the ICC Americas Championship in Bermuda, which they won. Also in 2004, Canada participated in the first ICC Intercontinental Cup, finishing as runners up to Scotland. The highlight of this tournament was the game against the US in Fort Lauderdale, Florida, when John Davison recorded the best match bowling figures since Jim Laker's 19 wickets against Australia in 1956.

In 2005, Canada again finished third in the ICC Trophy, which gained them official ODI status from 2006 until the 2009 ICC World Cup Qualifier, as well as qualifying them for the 2007 World Cup. Their performance in the Intercontinental Cup that year was not as good as in 2004 however, as they did not make it past the first round.

In 2006, Canada put in good performances in the four-day ICC Intercontinental Cup, beating Kenya by 25 runs and Bermuda by nine wickets, but their one-day form was a complete reversal, losing three times to Bermuda and Kenya, and a further loss to Zimbabwe.

In August, Canada took part in the first Division of the Americas Championship. They beat Argentina and longtime rivals the USA, but lost to the Cayman Islands and eventual winners Bermuda, and finished third, their worst performance so far in this tournament.

2010–2014

In June and July 2008, Canada hosted Bermuda for three ODIs and Intercontinental Cup matches against Bermuda and Scotland.

In August, Canada travelled to Ireland for the World Twenty20 Qualification Tournament. Canada did not qualify for the World Twenty20, finishing 5th ahead of Bermuda. The ODIs and an Intercontinental Cup match were hampered by rain.

In late summer of 2008, West Indies and Bermuda came to Canada to play in the Scotiabank One-Day Series against Canada. Canada defeated Bermuda, to face West Indies in the Final. West Indies captain Chris Gayle smashed his sixteenth ODI century and led his side to an easy seven-wicket victory against Canada in the finals of the Scotiabank ODI Series at King City.

During the Scotiabank Series the talents of Rizwan Cheema were discovered – he would become the star of the first Al-Barakah T20 Canada. The tournament involved Canada, Pakistan, Sri Lanka and Zimbabwe. Canada lost both and tied one match, however in the tie with Zimbabwe, Canada lost by points in a bowl-out. Sri Lanka were eventual winners, defeating Pakistan in the Final. The tournament was expected to be played annually for the following four years.

In late November 2008, Canada participated in the Americas Championship in Florida, USA. The United States, after years of disarray, pulled together and won the championship. Canada finished 3rd on Net Run Rate behind Bermuda, as their match was washed out by rain.

In April 2009 Canada participated in the 2009 ICC Cricket World Cup Qualification Tournament. Assembling the best Canadian team in many years, Canada rolled through the opening stages of the event and eventually finished second in the tournament. The impressive display earned Canada a berth in the 2011 ICC Cricket World Cup.

The ICC announced that the 2015 Cricket World Cup will only have 10 participating teams – this makes it difficult for the Associate Countries to qualify for the world cup. Cricket Canada expressed its unhappiness with the reduced world cup

In January 2014, Canada lost ODI & T20I status and with no prospect of big-stage international cricket to come until next qualifier, owing to a poor performance at the World Cup Qualifier in New Zealand.

2015

The big event for Canada to make a mark in the year 2015 was the ICC World Twenty20 Qualifier in Ireland and Scotland. Unfortunately, Canada failed to win a single match and finished at the bottom of Group B.

In the first match, against Kenya in the picturesque Edinburgh, Canada put together 143 runs in 20 overs with the loss of 5 wickets. In response, Irfan Karim's 54-ball 74 led Kenya to a convincing seven-wicket win.

The second match for Canada was against the relative newcomers to the scene, Oman, and was played in Stirling, Scotland. This game was reduced to 13 overs a side, down from 20 due to inclement weather. Canada's batting, after Oman opted to bowl first, was largely put together courtesy of a 25-ball 52 from Nitish Kumar, who scored four fours and three sixes. In response, Zeeshan Maqsood's unbeaten 86, powered Oman to a seven-wicket win with 10 balls to spare.

Canada played their third match of the tournament at the same venue in Stirling, Scotland against United Arab Emirates. UAE got off to the ideal start. Aside from winning the coin-toss, they decided to bowl first. Canada, batting first, lost their first 2 wickets in the first 8 balls bowled. It was followed by a solid partnership between Hiral Shah and Nitish Kumar who plundered 58 runs between them. But the tide turned again in UAE's favor as they picked up a heap of wickets to reduce Canada down to 109 for the loss of 9 wickets. But Navneet Dhaliwal came to the rescue with an unbeaten 39 to raise the total to 132 runs at the end of 20 overs. In response, UAE lost their first wicket in the third over but good partnerships for the second (25 runs), third (40 runs) and fourth (19 runs) wickets kept them on track. The match seemed level when the target was whittled down to 33 runs required in three overs which came down to 25 runs required off 12 balls. But, Shakoor and Patil brought UAE home in the last over after plundering Cecil Parvez for 21 runs in his final over.

Canada shifted back to Edinburgh for their fourth match of the tournament against hosts Scotland. Canada had lost the coin-toss again in this match and the home team inserted Canada into batting first. They got off to a quick start, racing to 24 in 2.3 overs before Alasdair Evans dismissed Ruvindu Gunasekara. The other bowlers too did not allow any meaningful partnerships to develop between any of the Canadian batsmen, reducing them to 87 for the loss of 8 wickets by the 16th over. A 48-run, ninth-wicket partnership between Navneet Dhaliwal (34*) and No. 10 Junaid Siddiqui, who scored 28 off 16, took them past the triple-figure mark to help them finish on 135 for 8. In response, Scotland started off brightly – at a stunning rate of 10 runs per over until the sixth over – even as Satsimranjit Dhindsa got rid of Calum MacLeod for a 15-ball 29. The wicket didn't cost Scotland much as they went about with the same momentum despite losing Matthew Cross to Dhindsa as well, and cruised to a comfortable win with 32 balls to spare.

Canada played their fifth and final match of the tournament at the same venue in Edinburgh against Netherlands. They lost the toss again and were inserted to bat again. This time though, the batting showed resilience and the team put together a total of 172 for the loss of 8 wickets which came on the back of a half-century from Ruvindu Gunasekera (51) and late blitzes from team captain Rizwan Cheema and wicket-keeper batsman Hamza Tariq. In response, the Netherlands batsmen, particularly Steven Myburgh, Wesley Barresi and Michael Swart led an attacking display of powerful batting to record a solid win for their team with 15 balls to spare. Thus, ending a dismal 2015 ICC World Twenty20 Qualifier for the Canada national cricket team.

Following the dismal performance at the 2015 ICC World Twenty20 qualifier, some positive news followed for the Canada national cricket team players. Twenty one players from Canada along with USA, Bermuda and Suriname were shortlisted to play for an 'ICC Americas' regional team to take part in West Indies' Nagico Super50 tournament in January 2016. By the end of the process, Jeremy Gordon was the only Canada bowler to be included and Canadian Hamza Tariq was brought in as a specialist wicket keeper in the final 15 man ICC Americas squad declared to participate in West Indies' Nagico Super50 in January 2016.

International grounds

Players

Current squad 

The following is a list of players were named in the most recent One-day or T20I squad. Updated 13 December 2022

Key
 C/G = Contract grade
 S/N = Shirt number

Tournament history

World Cup
1975: Did not participate
1979: First round
1983 to 1999 inclusive: Did not qualify
2003: First round
2007: First round
2011: First round
2015: Did not qualify
2019: Did not qualify

World Cricket League
2007 Division One: 4th place
2010 Division One: 5th place
2011–13 Championship: 8th place
2015 Division Two: Qualified
2018 Division Two: 3rd place
2019 Division Two: 5th place

Intercontinental Cup
2004: Runners up
2005: First round
2006: Runners up
2007–08: Equal 7th
2009–10: 7th
2011–13: 6th

Commonwealth Games
1998: First round

ICC 6 Nations Challenge
2002: 5th place
2004: 6th place

ICC World Cup Qualifier
1979: Runners up
1982: First round
1986: First round
1990: Second round
1994: Second round
1997: 7th place
2001: 3rd place
2005: 3rd place
2009: 2nd place
2014: 8th place

ICC Americas Championship
2000: Champions
2002: Runners up
2004: Champions
2006: 3rd place
2008: 3rd place
2010: Champions
2011: Champions

ICC T20 World Cup Qualifier
 2008: 5th place
 2010: Group stage
 2012: 6th place
 2013: 12th place
 2015: 14th place 
 2019: 9th place 
 2022: 5th place

Records
International Match Summary – Canada

Last updated 21 November 2022.

One Day Internationals
 Highest team total: 312/4 v Ireland, 4 February 2007 at Jaffery Sports Club Ground, Nairobi.
 Highest individual score: 137*, Ashish Bagai v Scotland, 31 January 2007 at Ruaraka Sports Club Ground, Nairobi.
 Best individual bowling figures: 5/27, Nick Frank v Bangladesh, 11 February 2003 at Kingsmead Cricket Ground, Durban.

Most ODI runs for Canada

Most ODI wickets for Canada

Highest individual innings in ODI 

Best bowling figures in an innings in ODI 

ODI record versus other nations

Records complete to ODI #3512. Last updated 28 January 2014.

Twenty20 Internationals
 Highest team total: 245/1 v Panama, 14 November 2021 at Coolidge Cricket Ground, Antigua. 
 Highest individual score: 109*, Aaron Johnson v Oman, 16 November 2022 at Oman Cricket Academy Ground Turf 1, Muscat.
 Best individual bowling figures: 5/16, Dillon Heyliger v Argentina, 13 November 2021 at Coolidge Cricket Ground, Antigua.

Most T20I runs for Canada

Most T20I wickets for Canada

T20I record versus other nations

Records complete to T20I #1910. Last updated 21 November 2022.

Other records

ICC Trophy
Highest team total: 356/5 v Papua New Guinea, 16 June 1986 at Walsall, England
Highest individual score: 164 not out, Paul Prashad v Papua New Guinea, 16 June 1986 at Walsall, England
Best innings bowling: 7/21, B Singh v Namibia, 14 February 1994 at Nairobi Club Ground, Kenya

Other cricket
Batting
Ray Nascimento 176 runs – Canada vs United States at Toronto Cricket, Skating and Curling Club Ground Toronto, 1963
Ken Trestrail 175 runs – Canada vs Combined Services at Chatham, England, 1954
Qaiser Ali 174 runs – Canada vs Netherlands at Pretoria, South Africa, 2006
John Davison 165 runs – Canada vs Bermuda at King City, Ontario, 2006
Paul Prashad 164 runs not out – Canada vs Papua New Guinea at (ICC Trophy) England, 1986
John Davison 131 runs – Canada vs Namibia at Pretoria, South Africa, 2009
Bowling
Joel Bradbury 9 wkts for 6 – Canada vs United States at Toronto, Ontario, 1854
Brian Christen 9 wkts for 38 – Canada vs United States at Toronto, Ontario, 1952
John Davison 9 wkts for 76 – Canada vs United States at Fort Lauderdale, Florida, 2004
Edward Ogden 9 wkts for 83 – Canada vs MCC at Lord's, England, 1887
Edward Ogden 8 wkts for 27 – Canada vs Warwickshire at Birmingham, England, 1887

See also

 Cricket Canada
 Sports in Canada
 Canadian women's cricket team
 Scotiabank National T20 Championship
 Canadian national cricket captains
 List of Canadian first-class cricketers

Notes

References

External links
Cricket Canada official website
Canada at CricketArchive
Independent website covering Canadian cricket
Cricinfo article on the history of Canadian cricket
Fan blog covering national team matches
Cricket Highlights

International
National cricket teams
Cricket